Ochreinauclea is a genus of plant in the family Rubiaceae. It contains the following species:
 Ochreinauclea maingayi (Hook.f.) Ridsdale
 Ochreinauclea missionis (Wall. ex G. Don) Ridsd.

References 

 
Rubiaceae genera
Taxonomy articles created by Polbot
Taxa named by Reinier Cornelis Bakhuizen van den Brink (born 1911)